Malcolm Holzman FAIA, is an American architect, who practices in New York City. He is a partner of Steinberg Hart and was founding partner of Holzman Moss Bottino Architecture (HMBA) and Hardy Holzman Pfeiffer Associates (HHPA). Holzman has planned, programmed, and designed over 130 projects for public use; including 35 library projects during the last five decades.

Life and career
Holzman was born in Newark, New Jersey, in 1940. He received a B. Arch. from Pratt Institute in 1963, and in 1964 began working with Hugh Hardy. Hardy Holzman Pfeiffer Associates (HHPA) was established in New York City in 1967. In 1981 HHPA received the AIA’s Architecture Firm Award. Also, in 1981, Holzman was elected to the college of Fellows at the American Institute of Architects. In 2004 HHPA separated and Holzman established HMBA with members of his HHPA project team. 

In October 2019 Holzman Moss Bottino Architecture merged with California-based Steinberg Hart, and Holzman became a partner of Steinberg Hart. 

Paul Goldberger describes how Holzman “tends to hide behind a sort of ‘Aw, Shucks’ manner, which belies the seriousness with which he takes his profession.”

He has held both the Saarinen and Davenport Visiting Professorships at Yale University, and endowed chairs at the University of Wisconsin–Milwaukee, Ball State University, the University of Texas, Syracuse University, Texas Tech University, the City College of New York, as well as teaching at Lawrence Technological University and Rensselaer Polytechnic Institute. Holzman is a member of the Interior Design Hall of Fame, the Municipal Art Society, the Architectural League of New York, and has served as a trustee of the Amon Carter Museum and Pratt Institute.

Style

Holzman has designed many important civic and academic structures throughout the United States, especially libraries, museums and performing arts venues. His collagist plans with rotated grids, diagonals and eclectic sensibilities, quickly established him as a pioneer.  His use of industrial and rural vernacular, as well as salvaged and local materials ran counter to reductionist modernist tendencies, resulting in a more humanist approach. In addition Holzman advocated the reuse of older buildings at a time when the profession embraced pristine modernism, exemplified by urban renewal.  Holzman was an early advocate of  sustainable building practices. Holzman has expressed his belief that the most effective and often overlooked method of greening modern building practices is to repurpose existing buildings and to design buildings with longer lifespans.

Holzman's signature is a courageous and creative materials palette, and he has recently published two books on the subject.  "No other contemporary architect uses traditional and unconventional materials with such invention, exuberance and wit.”  Holzman's interiors are "legendary" for his bold and eclectic use of color, pattern and texture, exemplified by his custom-designed fabrics, upholstery and carpeting. Holzman frequently uses stone, usually as large blocks with rich texture in a load-bearing capacity, as opposed to the contemporary stone veneers of curtain wall construction. He often collaborates with artists and incorporates their works into his buildings, most notably Albert Paley and Tom Otterness.

Early on, Holzman avoided characterizations or a design manifesto. Practicing in an era when architecture became increasingly dominated by factions, Holzman was an architect who “would rather build than talk,” believing that successful buildings are not born from theory but from careful attention to location and clients. This garnered Peter Eisenman’s pejorative assessment of “functionalism in drag.”  His 50-year career has spanned the majority of the Late Modernist movement.

List of published works 

 Theaters 2: Partnerships in Facility Use, Operations, and Management (2008)
 Material Life: Adventures and Discoveries in Materials Research (2008)
 Stone Work (2006)
 Theaters (2006)

See also
Hugh Hardy
Douglas Moss
Nestor Bottino

External links

  Holzman Moss Bottino Architecture Website
 Malcolm Holzman: 1992 Hall of Fame Inductee

References
Notes

20th-century American architects
Living people
Pratt Institute alumni
1940 births
University of Wisconsin–Milwaukee faculty
Ball State University faculty
Syracuse University faculty
21st-century American architects